Bang Nam Priao station, stylised on the current railway station sign as Bang Nam Prieo railway station, is a railway station located in Bang Nam Priao District, Chachoengsao Province, Thailand. The station lies on the Eastern Line Aranyaprathet Main Line.

References

Railway stations in Thailand